Wenham Parva is a civil parish in Suffolk, England. It covers the village of Little Wenham (whose ancient name it takes) and the hamlet of Wenham Grange. Located in Babergh district, it had a population of 20 in 2005, making it the joint-least populated parish in Suffolk alongside South Cove, Wangford and Wordwell. At the 2011 Census the population had increased to 185.

The parish contains the Wenham Thicks nature reserve, which is a Scheduled Monument due to its Ancient Woodland. The defunct Hadleigh branch line ran through the centre of the parish.

References

Civil parishes in Suffolk
Babergh District